The Nairobi police station bombing occurred in front of a police station in Nairobi, Kenya on 23 April 2014. The bomb killed at least 4 people including 2 police.

References

Explosions in 2014
2014 murders in Kenya
2010s in Nairobi
Attacks in Africa in 2014
April 2014 events in Africa
Attacks on police stations in the 2010s
Car and truck bombings in Kenya
Crime in Nairobi
Mass murder in 2014
Terrorist incidents in Kenya in 2014
2014 Nairobi police station bombing
Building bombings in Kenya
Attacks on buildings and structures in 2014